The 1963 NCAA Men's Soccer Tournament was the fifth organized men's college soccer tournament by the National Collegiate Athletic Association, to determine the top college soccer team in the United States. The Saint Louis Billikens won their fourth title, defeating the Navy Midshipmen, 3–0, in the final on December 7, 1963. This was the first tournament after the bracket was expanded from 8 teams to 16 teams. The tournament final was played in East Brunswick, New Jersey.

Teams

Bracket

See also 
 1963 NAIA Soccer Championship

References 

Championship
NCAA Division I Men's Soccer Tournament seasons
NCAA
NCAA
NCAA Soccer Tournament
NCAA Soccer Tournament